Ashleigh Elizabeth Johnson (born September 12, 1994) is an American water polo player considered by many to be the best goalkeeper in the world. She was part of the American team that won the gold medal at the 2015 World Aquatics Championships. In 2016, she became the first African-American woman to make the US Olympic team in water polo. She was part of the gold-medal winning 2016 and 2020 U.S. women's water polo Olympic teams.

Early life
Johnson was raised by her mother, Donna Johnson. Johnson grew up with four siblings (three brothers and one sister), all of whom play water polo. Her brothers are Blake, Julius and William. Her younger sister Chelsea, is a 2 Meter player and played with Johnson at Princeton. Chelsea graduated from Princeton in 2018 and continues to be involved with water polo in Miami. Ashleigh Johnson graduated from Princeton in 2017 with a bachelor's degree in psychology.

About her decision to play goalie in water polo, Johnson shared with Princeton Alumni Weekly her goalie origins trace back to her sister Chelsea:

Water polo career

High school
Johnson was raised in Miami, Florida and attended Ransom Everglades School for high school. At Ransom Everglades, she was a four-year letter winner and starter on her school's team guiding them to three consecutive Florida State Championships. She also earned All-Dade honors throughout career, while also earning all-county honors twice in swimming.

As a senior, Johnson committed to play water polo at Princeton University.

Collegiate career
In her first year she was named Third-Team All American, while earning Honorable Mention as a sophomore in 2014, and Second Team as a junior in 2015.

2016 Summer Olympics

Johnson was the first African-American woman to make the US Olympic water polo team when she made the team for the 2016 Summer Olympics. The geographical diversity Johnson brought to the team, she was the only team member not from California, was highlighted by SwimSwam before the Olympic Games. Her age, 21 years old, and with her sub-Saharan African ancestry, she identifies as Black, were highlighted by Sports Illustrated leading up to the 2016 Olympic Games. She helped the team win the gold medal at the Olympic Games.

Orizzonte Catania, Italy
From January 2018 she has been hired by the Orizzonte Catania, the most titled club in Europe in recent times. She lives and trains in Italy for Orizzonte Catania during the season, training in the United States in the off-season.

Ethnikos Piraeus, Greece 
For the 2021-22 season, she is the goalkeeper of Greek Ethnikos Piraeus, a club with big tradition in Greek waterpolo.  On March 30, she won the Women's LEN Trophy with Ethnikos Piraeus. That was the second time Ethnikos has won the title, thus becoming the Greek team with the most in the competition. Meanwhile, that was Johnson's first European club competition title.

Awards
 Swimming World 2014 Female Water Polo Player of the Year
 Swimming World 2015 Female Water Polo Player of the Year
 Swimming World 2016 Female Water Polo Player of the Year
 Swimming World 2019 Female Water Polo Player of the Year
 Forbes, Sports 30 Under 30: 2022

See also
 Diversity in swimming
 List of Olympic champions in women's water polo
 List of Olympic medalists in water polo (women)
 List of women's Olympic water polo tournament goalkeepers
 List of world champions in women's water polo
 List of World Aquatics Championships medalists in water polo
United States women's Olympic water polo team records and statistics

References

External links
 
 

Living people
1994 births
Sportspeople from Miami
American female water polo players
Water polo goalkeepers
Water polo players at the 2016 Summer Olympics
Medalists at the 2016 Summer Olympics
Olympic gold medalists for the United States in water polo
World Aquatics Championships medalists in water polo
Water polo players at the 2015 Pan American Games
Water polo players at the 2019 Pan American Games
Pan American Games medalists in water polo
Pan American Games gold medalists for the United States
Medalists at the 2015 Pan American Games
Medalists at the 2019 Pan American Games
Water polo players at the 2020 Summer Olympics
Princeton Tigers women's water polo players
Medalists at the 2020 Summer Olympics
Ethnikos Piraeus Water Polo Club players